Rachel Bowlby FBA (born 29 January 1957) is Professor of Comparative Literature at University College London.

Biography
Bowlby completed undergraduate studies in Latin and Greek Literature at the University of Oxford (1979) and a PhD in Comparative Literature at Yale University in 1983. She held positions at the University of Sussex, University of Oxford, and the University of York before joining UCL in 2004 as Lord Northcliffe Professor of English Literature. Between 2014 and 2016 Bowlby was Professor of Comparative Literature. She rejoined UCL in 2017. Bowlby was elected as a Fellow of the British Academy in 2007.

Select publications
Bowlby, R. H. 2013. A Child of One's Own: Parental Stories. Oxford, Oxford University Press.
Bowlby, R. H. 2007. Freudian Mythologies: Greek Tragedy and Modern Identities. Oxford, Oxford University Press.
Bowlby, R. H. 2001. Carried Away: The Invention of Modern Shopping. Columbia University Press.

References

1957 births
Fellows of the British Academy
Living people
Academics of University College London
Princeton University faculty
Yale Graduate School of Arts and Sciences alumni
Alumni of the University of Oxford